Michael Cosgrove was a Scottish footballer who played in Scotland, England and the United States.

In January 1920, Cosgrove signed for Dundee Hibernian from local junior club Dundee North End. In May 1921, he moved to Tottenham Hotspur  On 15 February 1923, Cosgrove joined Celtic but did not enter a first-team game. That summer, he moved to the United States and signed with the Brooklyn Wanderers of the American Soccer League. He began the 1924-1925 season with Brooklyn, played one game, then returned to Scotland where he joined Aberdeen F.C.  Over four seasons, he played seventy-three games (sixty-five league games), scoring five league goals. In May 1928, Aberdeen sent him to Bristol Rovers F.C.  When he retired, he returned to Scotland until 1930 when he moved his wife and family to the United States, becoming an American citizen in 1937.

References

External links
 Aberdeen: Mike Cosgrove
 

1901 births
1972 deaths
Aberdeen F.C. players
American Soccer League (1921–1933) players
Bristol Rovers F.C. players
Brooklyn Wanderers players
Celtic F.C. players
Dundee United F.C. players
Tottenham Hotspur F.C. players
Scottish footballers
Scottish expatriate footballers
Expatriate soccer players in the United States
Scottish Football League players
Dundee North End F.C. players
Association football wing halves
Scottish expatriate sportspeople in the United States